Morganti is a surname. Notable people with the surname include:

Al Morganti (born 1953), American hockey analyst
Emidio Morganti (born 1966), Italian soccer referee
Fausta Morganti (1944–2021), San Marinese politician